Boissise may refer to several communes in France:
 Boissise-la-Bertrand, in the Seine-et-Marne department
 Boissise-le-Roi, in the Seine-et-Marne department